Anna Teresa Jakubowska (née Swierczewska) ps. Paulinka (26 May 1927 – 13 July 2022) was a Polish World War II combatant and community activist, participant of the Warsaw Uprising.

Jakubowska was a member of the Chapter of the Order of Polonia Restituta. She died on 13 July 2022, at the age of 95.

Decorations
Honorary badge "For Merit for the Protection of Human Rights"  by the Polish Commissioner for Human Rights
2006: Knight's Cross of the Order of Polonia Restituta
1992: Warsaw Uprising Cross
1944: Cross of Valour
1984: Armia Krajowa Cross

References

1927 births
2022 deaths
Warsaw Uprising insurgents
Polish dissidents
Recipients of the Order of Polonia Restituta
Recipients of the Cross of Valour (Poland)
Recipients of the Armia Krajowa Cross
Women in World War II